Valea lui Stan may refer to the following places in Romania:

 Valea lui Stan, a tributary of the Argeș in Argeș County 
 Valea lui Stan, a tributary of the Lotru in Vâlcea County
 Valea lui Stan, a village in the town Brezoi, Vâlcea County